The Iranian National Institute for Oceanography and Atmospheric Science (INIOAS, Persian:  Pazhoheshgah e Melli e Oghianoos Shenasi va Oloum e Javvi) is a research center established by Iran's Ministry of Science, Research and Technology in 1992 under the name 'Iran Oceanography Center' to perform research in the field of oceanography. In March 2010, the organization was renamed to 'Iranian National Center for Oceanography (INCO)'. In June 2013, the organization was again renamed to 'Iranian National Institute for Oceanography and Atmospheric Science (INIOAS)'.

Upon its completion, INIOAS will have the Khalije Fars sea explorer at its disposal to conduct oceanographic research.

References

External links
Iranian National Institute for Oceanography and Atmospheric Science English website

Research institutes in Iran
Scientific organisations based in Iran
Oceanographic organizations
Meteorological research institutes
Research institutes established in 1992
1992 establishments in Iran